Ángela Daniela Barón (born 18 September 2003) is a footballer who plays as a defender for D'Feeters Kicks. Born in the United States, she represents the Colombia women's national team.

International career
Barón was eligible to represent Colombia and the United States at the international level.

Barón made her international debut in a friendly againtst the Ecuador on 13 April 2021. On 3 July 2022, she was called up by Nelson Abadía to represent Colombia at the 2022 Copa América Femenina.

Personal life
Barón was born to an American father and Colombian mother from Bogotá.

Honours
Colombia
Copa América Femenina runner-up: 2022

References

External links

2003 births
Living people
American people of Colombian descent
American women's soccer players
Colombian women's footballers
Women's association football defenders
Colombia women's international footballers
21st-century American women
21st-century Colombian women